Platnickina is a genus of comb-footed spiders that was first described by A. Ö. Koçak & M. Kemal in 2008.

Description 
As comb-footed spiders, Platnickina have two body segments (prosoma and opisthosoma) and eight legs. The tarsi of the final leg pair have rows of strong, serrated bristles ventrally.

Platnickina can be distinguished from other theridiid genera by the presence of trichobothria on the metatarsi of the third leg pair, the opisthosoma not being higher than it is long, and the absence of a colulus. Also, the European species at least are bright yellow with black mottling.

Species
 it contains eleven species, found worldwide:
Platnickina alabamensis (Gertsch & Archer, 1942) – USA, Canada
Platnickina antoni (Keyserling, 1884) – USA
Platnickina fritilla Gao & Li, 2014 – China
Platnickina kijabei (Berland, 1920) – East Africa
Platnickina maculata (Yoshida, 2001) (type) – Japan
Platnickina mneon (Bösenberg & Strand, 1906) – South America. Introduced to Ghana, Seychelles, China, Japan, Pacific Is.
Platnickina nigropunctata (Lucas, 1846) – Mediterranean
Platnickina punctosparsa (Emerton, 1882) – USA
Platnickina qionghaiensis (Zhu, 1998) – China
Platnickina sterninotata (Bösenberg & Strand, 1906) – Russia (Far East), China, Korea, Japan
Platnickina tincta (Walckenaer, 1802) – North America, Europe, Turkey, Caucasus, Russia (Europe to South Siberia), Kazakhstan, Iran

In synonymy:
P. adamsoni (Berland, 1934) = Platnickina mneon (Bösenberg & Strand, 1906)
P. blatchleyi (Bryant, 1945) = Platnickina mneon (Bösenberg & Strand, 1906)
P. cinerascens (Roewer, 1942) = Platnickina alabamensis (Gertsch & Archer, 1942)
P. hobbsi (Gertsch & Archer, 1942) = Platnickina mneon (Bösenberg & Strand, 1906)
P. insulicola (Bryant, 1947) = Platnickina mneon (Bösenberg & Strand, 1906)
P. talmo (Chamberlin & Ivie, 1944) = Platnickina alabamensis (Gertsch & Archer, 1942)

See also
 List of Theridiidae species
 List of spiders of Texas

References

Further reading

External links

Araneomorphae genera
Spiders of Africa
Spiders of Asia
Spiders of North America
Theridiidae